List of ports may refer to any of the lists given in Lists of ports.
It may also refer to:

 List of spaceports
 List of ports of entry in Nepal
 List of ports of entry in South Africa
 List of TCP and UDP port numbers